Nippon Life Stadium, also called Nippon Seimei Stadium is a former baseball stadium in Japan. The Kintetsu Buffaloes of the Nippon League played there.

References

Defunct baseball venues in Japan
Nippon Life